Traian T. Coșovei (28 November 1954 – 1 January 2014) was a Romanian poet. He was a member of the Writers' Union of Romania.

The son of writer Traian Coșovei and Maria Urdăreanu, he graduated from the Department of Romanian Language and Literature of the University of Bucharest in 1978. He wrote a thesis on the Beat Generation.

A so-called "80s Generation" writer, he was a member of the "Monday Literary Circle" led by Nicolae Manolescu, and of the literary circle led by Ovid S. Crohmălniceanu.

Coșovei's literary debut came in 1978 with the publication of a story in the magazine Literary Romania. The following year, he began editing the Romanian Paper. In 1980 he became a member of the Writers' Union of Romania. In 1996 he was appointed in the National Museum of Romanian Literature, Bucharest, a job he held until his death.

Coșovei died on 1 January 2014, at the age of 59.

Books
 Ninsoarea electrică ("The Electrical Snowfall"), Cartea Românească, 1978
 1, 2, 3 SAU… , Albatros, 1980
 Cruciada întreruptă ("The Discontinued Crusade"), Cartea Românească, 1982
 Aer cu diamante ("Air with Diamonds"), (anthology), ed. Litera, 1982
 Poemele siameze ("The Siamese Poems"), Albatros, 1983
 În așteptarea cometei ("Waiting for the Comet"), Cartea Românească, 1986
 Rondul de noapte ("The Night Watch"), Militară, 1987
 Pornind de la un vers ("Starting from One Line") (literary criticism), Eminescu, 1990
 Bătrânețile unui băiat cuminte ("The Old Age of a Good Boy"), Pontica, 1994
 Mickey Mouse e mort ("Mickey Mouse Is Dead"), Cartea Românească, 1994
 Ioana care rupe poeme ("Ioana who rips poems apart"), Asociația Scriitorilor & Cartea Românească, 1996
 Patinează sau crapă! ("Skate or Die!"), Axa, 1997
 Ninsoarea electrică ("The Electrical Snowfall"), Second edition, Vinea, 1998
 Percheziționarea îngerilor ("The Frisking of the Angels"), Crater, 1998
 Lumină de la frigider ("Light from the Refrigerator"), Cartea Românească, 1998
 Bună dimineața, Vietnam! ("Good Morning, Vietnam!"), Călăuza, 1999
 Hotel Urmuz (literary criticism), Călăuza, 2000
 Institutul de glasuri ("The Institute of Voices"), (anthology), Cartea Românească, 2002
 Vânătoarea pe capete, Libra, 2002
 Greva căpșunelor ("The Strawberry Strike"), Libra, 2004
 Aeorstate plângând ("Crying Aerostates"), Tracus Arte, 2010

Awards
Romanian Writers' Union's Newcomer Award (1979)
Bucharest Writers' Association Award (1994)
Romanian Academy Award (1996)

References

1954 births
2014 deaths
Writers from Bucharest
20th-century Romanian poets
Romanian male poets
Romanian literary critics
University of Bucharest alumni
20th-century Romanian male writers